Balaka pauciflora is a species of flowering plant in the family Arecaceae. It is found only in Fiji.
The specific epithet pauciflora is Latin for 'few-flowered'.

References

pauciflora
Endemic flora of Fiji
Taxa named by Odoardo Beccari